These are the top 25 albums of 2006  in Australia from the Australian Recording Industry Association (ARIA) End of Year Albums Chart.

Top 25

References 

Australian record charts
2006 in Australian music
Australia Top 25 albums